William Scott Day (January 31, 1923 – May 27, 1984) was an American politician in the state of Washington. He served in the Washington House of Representatives from 1959 to 1969 and in the Senate from 1969 to 1981. He was Speaker of the House from 1963 to 1965.

References

1923 births
1984 deaths
Democratic Party members of the Washington House of Representatives
20th-century American politicians
Democratic Party Washington (state) state senators